Xihaigu is a region forming the southern tip of Ningxia, China. It consists of the seven county-level divisions Yuanzhou, Xiji, Longde, Jingyuan, Pengyang, Haiyuan and Tongxin. The former five counties being part of Guyuan city. It forms one of the poorest areas in China. The name derives from the names of Xiji, Haiyuan and Guyuan. In the 1970s, Xihaigu was named one of "most unfit place for human settlement" by the World Food Programme due to its fragile ecology and vulnerability for droughts. Due to climate change, destruction of forests during the Tang and Ming dynasty and later intensive farming and rapid population growth, the area was transformed from fertile grounds to arid land. Previously, the forests would retain water for dry periods.

The Chinese government funds water conservation technology and ecological restoration. Since 1983, there have been several rounds of forced relocation of settlements away from ecologically sensitive areas.

See also 

 Dingxi, a nearby region with similar issues

References 

Regions of China
Geography of Ningxia